Meokgol Station is a station on the Seoul Subway Line 7. The name of this station means "Inkstick village" in native Korean, and the neighborhood in which the station is located is the Chinese translation of this name.

Station layout

References

Railway stations opened in 1996
Seoul Metropolitan Subway stations
Metro stations in Jungnang District